Echinodorus pubescens is a species of aquatic plant in the family Alismataceae. Rataj places it in his Section Paniculati - Subgenus Echinodorus

Note described and known from only one specimen. Almost certainly not in cultivation.

Distribution
It is endemic to Brazil.

References

pubescens
Plants described in 1975